Wenshu is located in Guangshan County in southeastern Henan province, China. The name of "Wenshu, 文殊" comes from Buddism (Manjushri). , it has 1 residential community and 21 villages under its administration.

See also 
 List of township-level divisions of Henan
 Chenpeng Village Primary School stabbing
Townships of the People's Republic of China

References 

Township-level divisions of Henan
Xinyang